Anne Elizabeth Boden  (born January 1960) is a British tech entrepreneur. She is the founder and CEO of Starling Bank, a UK mobile-only bank. In 2018, she received an MBE for services to financial technology.

Early life 
Boden was born in Bon-y-maen a suburb of Swansea, the daughter of a steelworker and a department store worker. She was a pupil at Cefn Hengoed Comprehensive and graduated from Swansea University in 1981 with a degree in Chemistry and Computer Sciences. After the financial crisis, Boden sold the house in Swansea where she spent her weekends, in order to raise funds and hire staff at her company.

Career 
After graduating, she had intended to go into IT but, as a backup plan, applied for a job as a graduate trainee with Lloyds Banking Group, where her career was launched. This was followed by spells at Standard Chartered Bank, UBS, and as Chief Information Officer at AON Corporation. Boden later joined ABN AMRO and RBS, serving as Head of EMEA and as head of Global Transaction Banking. At the group, she ran a payments business across 34 countries.

Boden earned her MBA from Middlesex University in 1990 while working for Standard Chartered. In 2011 she served on the Board of Governors of Middlesex University, which awarded her an honorary doctorate degree in July 2018.

She joined Allied Irish Banks in 2012 as Chief Operating Officer to help turn round the bank's fortunes after the financial crisis of 2008.

In 2020 Boden became a member of the board of the trade association for the UK's banks and financial services companies, UK Finance, and also an advisor to the UK government's Board of Trade.

Anne is a member of the World Economic Forum.

Starling Bank 
Boden founded her online banking business in June 2014, originally named Possible Financial Services, with the tagline "Bank Possible". Her objective was to create an entirely on-line bank that gave easier feedback to customers.

In February 2015, co-founder Tom Blomfield departed Starling Bank to found Monzo. The other four directors left with him.

The company rebranded as Starling in January 2016, and received its UK banking licence that year. The Telegraph described the company as "the Amazon of banking" after it received multiple investments from Austrian-born billionaire Harald McPike.

Boden lost her position as majority shareholder in Starling in July 2019 after a large investment from McPike during a series C funding round in February. McPike has to date invested £75m (for a 60% stake) in the company, followed by a £50m share held by Merian Global Investors. The company has raised £233m to date. Boden now holds approximately 25% of the company. The bank currently (Jan 2020) has a reported 275,000 customers in the UK. 
Boden is a member of Tech Nation's FinTech Delivery Panel and has spoken at industry events such as Money20/20 and Wealth 2.0.

References

External links

1960 births
Living people
Alumni of Swansea University
Alumni of Middlesex University
British women chief executives
British technology company founders
Members of the Order of the British Empire
People from Swansea
Welsh bankers
NatWest Group people